A scrim is a woven material, either finely woven lightweight fabric widely used in theatre, or a heavy, coarse woven material used for reinforcement in both building and canvasmaking.

Light gauzy material
A scrim or gauze is often a very light textile made from cotton, or sometimes flax or other materials. It is lightweight and translucent, which means it is often used for making curtains. The fabric can also be used for bookbinding and upholstery.

Scrims have seen extensive use in theatre. There are several types used for special effects. The variety typically used for special effects is called sharkstooth scrim.  However, in theater a scrim can refer to any such thin screen, and is made out of a wide variety of materials. Sharkstooth scrim is woven and earns its name because the weave resembles a set of triangles that resemble a shark's teeth with openings similar in size to a window screen's.

The most common effects that scrim is used for is the 'reveal effect', in which an actor or scene is made to appear or disappear by using the scrim and appropriate lighting. Other common effects include sharp silhouettes, backlit from behind the scrim, or other shadow effects (shrinking and growing a shadow).

The bobbinet/bobbinette is a type of scrim that has a hexagonal hole shape and comes in a variety of hole sizes. It is used for a number of lighting effects in the film and theatre industries.

Scrim is also used in clothing, usually covering the face or head.  This allows the wearer to see out, while preventing others from seeing in.  This may also be combined with camouflage to completely hide a person, such as a sniper.

A scrim was an integral part of the Beijing Olympic Stadium in Beijing. It was the screen running around the top of the stadium during the opening ceremonies on which all kinds of scenes were projected. Li Ning ran around it just before the cauldron lighting for 2008 Summer Olympics.

A scrim (also called a screen) is used as an acoustically transparent covering for a loudspeaker to protect the diaphragm and dust cap, or as an air filter element to protect the voice coil and other components of the transducer.

Applications to stage lighting 
Scrims both reflect and transmit light.  This means that if a light from a front-of-house position is shone at a scrim, then both the scrim and everything behind it will be lit.  This can lead to a variety of interesting effects:
A scrim will appear entirely opaque if everything behind it is unlit and the scrim itself is grazed by light from the sides or from above.
A scrim will appear nearly transparent if a scene behind it is lit, but there is no light on the scrim.
A dreamy or foggy look can be achieved by lighting a scene entirely behind a scrim.
If a light with a gobo is aimed at a scrim, the image will appear on the scrim, but also any objects behind the scrim will be lit by the pattern as well.

In general, anything that is lit will be seen on both sides of a scrim: scrims do not absorb light. Scrim can also be used in theatre in combination with a cyclorama or backdrop. The idea is similar to the other uses. When the drop is lit (or images or video are rear-projected onto the back of the drop), the images or colours projected are visible. However, when the drop is not lit, the images or colors will disappear. A scrim can also help dull the image, creating a greater sense of depth.

Another effect is caused by layering two scrims, or even by placing a mirror behind a scrim and lighting it: the familiar moire effect. This can often cause audience disorientation.

Reinforcement material

The technique of using scrim as a reinforcement occurs commonly in the manufacture of glass-fiber or carbon-fiber composites: scrim layers may cover the exterior surface of the carbon-fiber laminate for an improved protective surface. Jute scrim can reinforce plaster in sculpture, when casting or working directly in plaster.

A similar usage of the term is found in sailcloth manufacture, where scrim is a strong loose weave of fibres laminated into the cloth to provide extra strength and stability to sails.

In carpentry, scrim is a very heavy, coarsely-woven fabric (similar to  hessian or to coarse canvas) which is stretched over interior boards to provide support for wallpaper and to add an extra rigidity. This method of construction, widely used in older houses, is often referred to as "scrim and sarking", the sarking being the board.

Scrim is also an item that utilizes plies of tissue reinforced with a layer of nylon (much like fishing line or heavy duty monofilament) or cotton thread. 2-ply tissue 1-ply scrim the layer of scrim is not counted in the ply count. 2/1 would be a 2-ply scrim.

Scrim is a glass fibre (previously burlap) open-mesh tape used to cover joints in plasterboard/wall board prior to plastering. It prevents a crack appearing in the plaster finish at a later date. The roll of tape may be plain or adhesive-coated to facilitate its installation.

Scrim was handed out during World War II to tape windows, so that they should not cause hazardous shrapnel in case of bomb blasts.

References 

 Kersmaekers, Ivo (2019): Gauzes in Theatre. Their use through the ages. In: Die Vierte Wand. Organ der Initiative TheaterMuseum Berlin. 009/2019, pp. 146–151 (online at the Internet Archive)

External links 
 

Woven fabrics
Scenic design
Stage lighting
Building
Loudspeakers

de:Gaze
fr:Gaze
ru:Газ (ткань)
sv:Gas (textil)